The Ukukit is a river in Yakutia (Sakha Republic), Russia.

The river flows north of the Arctic Circle across a lonely, desolate area of the Olenyoksky District devoid of settlements. In the 1980s kimberlite dikes were discovered by geologists in the basin of the Ukukit.

Course  
The Ukukit is a left tributary of the Olenyok. Its sources are in the northeastern corner of the Central Siberian Plateau. It heads first eastwards and, about halfway down its course, it bends and flows roughly northeastwards.

The Ukukit is fed by rain and snow. It is frozen between early October and late May or early June.

See also
List of rivers of Russia
Dike (geology)

References

External links 
Viktor Muzis. Кимберлитовые дайки реки Укукит
Schematic map of ancient terrains and kimberlitic fields in the Siberian craton
Fishing & Tourism in Yakutia

Rivers of the Sakha Republic
Tributaries of the Olenyok